Miang kham is a traditional Southeast Asian snack from Thailand and Laos. It was introduced to the Siamese court of King Rama V by Princess Dara Rasmi. In Malaysia it is called Sirih Kaduk. The name miang kham translates to 'one bite wrap', from miang ('food wrapped in leaves') and kham ('a bite').

Ingredients
Miang kham mostly consists of raw fresh Piper sarmentosum or Erythrina fusca leaves that are filled with roasted coconut shavings and the following main ingredients chopped or cut into small pieces:
Shallots
Fresh red or green bird's eye chili peppers
Ginger
Garlic
Lime (Citrus aurantifolia), including the peel
 Roasted Coconut
Chopped unsalted peanuts or cashew nuts
Small dried shrimps

Background information
Miang kham is a snack food that originated in the northern part of Thailand, originally using pickled tea leaves (called miang in the northern Thai language). The dish is mentioned in Epic of the Verse of foods, a book  written by the King Rama II. In Thailand, Miang kham is usually eaten with family and friends. It is also popular in the Central Region of Thailand. This dish is mostly eaten during the raining season for it is then that cha phlu leaves are abundantly available, as it grows new leaves and shoots.

Before wrapping the filled leaves are topped with palm syrup or sugar cane syrup which often has been cooked with lemongrass, galangal, ginger and fish sauce.

Variants
 In Vientiane, the capital of Laos, miang is often folded in cooked cabbage leaves (kaalampii) or lettuce. Alternately, other leaves, such as spinach, can be used.

A variation called miang pla includes pieces of deep-fried fish in addition to the standard ingredients.

 In Thai royal cuisine in the central part of Thailand, have an alternate of wrap that adept the dish to represent of beautiful and social status e.g. Miang Kreep Bua or Miang Kham Bua Lhuang

Miang Kham Bua Lhuang (Thai:เมี่ยงคำบัวหลวง) is a snack dish originated in Thai royal cuisine in the central part of Thailand. Miang Kham Bua Lhuang (Eng: Lotus petals wrapped bite-size appetizer) is usually eaten with family and friends. This dish is mostly eaten as appetizer or snack during the meals. The name "Miang Kham" means "one bite-size wrap". Form Miang (snack wrapped in piper sarmentosum leaves) and Kham (one bite) in Thailand (Miang Kham, 2018.). Normally, this dish can have many types of wrap such as Piper sarmentosum (Thai:ใบชะพลู) and pickled tea leaves (Thai:ใบเมี่ยง)which are originated in the north of Thailand.

Ingredients

When talking about "lotus" most people might think of lotus as offering to monks and Buddha. Actually, lotus petals can be eaten with many nutritional benefits e.g. high fiber for detoxifying and nourishing health. Also it can be cooked in good side dishes such as Ingredients of Miang Kham Bua Lhuang (Miang Kham Bua Lhuang, 2012), with other ingredient e.g. shallots, chili peppers, gingers, garlic, limes, coconut sugar. (Miang Kham Bua Lhuang Thai traditional snack food for good health, 2012).

References

External links

Thai cuisine
Snack foods
Lao cuisine
Vegetable dishes of Thailand